Bruria Kaufman (August 21, 1918 – January 7, 2010) was an American theoretical physicist. She contributed to Albert Einstein's general theory of relativity, to statistical physics, where she used applied spinor analysis to rederive the result of Lars Onsager on the partition function of the two-dimensional Ising model, and to the study of the Mössbauer effect, on which she collaborated with John von Neumann and Harry Lipkin.

Biography 

Bruria Kaufman was born in New York City to a Jewish family of Ukrainian origin. In 1926 the family immigrated to the British Mandate for Palestine, living first in Tel Aviv, and then in Jerusalem. Her main interests during her youth were music and mathematics.

She studied mathematics, earning a B.Sc. from Hebrew University of Jerusalem in 1938, and a PhD from Columbia University in 1948. She married the linguist Zellig S. Harris in 1941.

In 1960, she settled on Kibbutz Mishmar Ha'emek and adopted a daughter, Tami.

Kaufman returned to the US in 1982. They lived in Pennsylvania, where her husband taught. He died in 1992. Kaufman moved to Arizona and  married the Nobel laureate Willis Eugene Lamb in 1996, although the marriage ended in divorce. She died in January 2010 at Carmel Hospital in Haifa, following a stay at a nursing home in Kiryat Tiv'on, not far from Haifa. In keeping with her wishes, her body was cremated.

Scientific career
Kaufman was a research associate at the Institute for Advanced Study in Princeton from 1948 to 1955, where she worked with John von Neumann (1947/48) and with Albert Einstein (1950–1955). She spent the following years at the University of Pennsylvania working on a mathematical linguistics project.

Kaufman returned to Israel in 1960 (with Harris) where she became professor at the Weizmann Institute of Science in Rehovot (1960–1971) and later on at the University of Haifa (1972–1988).

Selected publications 
 
 
 "Transition Points", Physical Society Cambridge International Conference on Low Temperatures (1946), with L. Onsager.
  Kaufman's contribution is to an appendix which appeared in later editions, and was revised and published as "Algebraic Properties of the Field in the Relativistic Theory of the Asymmetric Field".

 
 "Mathematical Structure of the Non-symmetric Field Theory", Proceedings of the Fiftieth Anniversary Conference on Relativity 227–238 (1955).

References 

Israeli physicists
Israeli Jews
1918 births
2010 deaths
Academic staff of the University of Haifa
Academic staff of Weizmann Institute of Science
American people of Russian-Jewish descent
American emigrants to Israel
Jewish physicists
Israeli mathematicians
Women mathematicians
20th-century women scientists